Album of the Year (最優秀アルバム賞)

Results
The following table displays the nominees and the winners in bold print with a yellow background.

2000s

2010s

See also
MTV Europe Music Award for Best Album

MTV Video Music Awards Japan